Thomas Budge (born 15 March 1982) is an Australian actor. Budge was born in Melbourne, Victoria. Early in his acting career, Budge appeared in a number of Australian television shows, including Neighbours, Round the Twist, and Shock Jock.  After a few years, Budge transitioned from television to film, and he has appeared in a number of Australian films, including The Proposition, Kokoda, Candy, Bran Nue Dae, and Last Train to Freo, for which he was nominated in 2006 by both the Australian Film Institute and the Film Critics Circle of Australia Awards for best supporting actor.

From 2008 to 2009, Budge appeared in several episodes of the television drama East of Everything. Budge also makes an appearance in the WW2 TV mini-series The Pacific, which
aired in 2010.  In 2008, Budge was tipped to play AC/DC guitarist Angus Young in a movie about the former AC/DC lead singer Bon Scott.

When not on set, Budge has said that he enjoys playing guitar and singing. He also performs in The Tom Budge Band.

In the 2005 film The Proposition, Budge plays the character Samuel Stoat. He sings the Canadian folk song "Peggy Gordon", which can be found on YouTube.

In 2015 Budge portrayed Cliff Sutton in the miniseries Gallipoli.

In early 2020, it was announced that Tom Budge had been cast in an undisclosed role in The Lord Of The Rings on Amazon Prime. In March 2021, he walked away from the role saying that "after recently seeing the first episodes shot over the last year Amazon has decided to go in another direction with the character I was portraying."

Filmography

Awards
Nominated: 2006 Nominated AFI Award Best Supporting Actor- Last Train to Freo.
Nominated: 2006 Nominated FCCA Award Best Actor in a Supporting Role-Last Train to Freo.

References

External links

1982 births
Australian male television actors
Australian male film actors
Male actors from Melbourne
Living people